Bryan Gonçalves (born 19 July 1996) is a French professional footballer who plays as a centre-back for Laval.

Career
Gonçalves was a youth player for Conflans FC and FC Herblay where he played as a striker. He pretended he played as a centre-back in a trial with Paris Saint-Germain and ended up joining their reserves at the age of 18. He began his senior career with their reserves in 2015. He was released and moved to non-league football with Conflans FC before moving to Toulouse Rodéo in 2017. After a short stint with them, he again moved to non-league football with Saint-Leu before moving to the reserves of Marseille in 2018. He followed that up with successive stints at semi-pro clubs Houilles and Racing Besançon, before moving to the Championnat National 3 side Versailles and helping them achieve promotion in his debut season with them. On 17 June 2021, he transferred to Laval in the Championnat National. He again won promotion with Laval in his debut season, this time into the Ligue 2 as a starter.

Personal life
Born in France, Gonçalves is of Portuguese descent through his mother.

Honours
Versailles
Championnat National 3: 2019–20

Laval
Championnat National: 2021–22

References

External links
 
 Ligue 1 profile
 FDB profile

1996 births
Living people
People from Maisons-Laffitte
French footballers
French people of Portuguese descent
Paris Saint-Germain F.C. players
Olympique de Marseille players
Racing Besançon players
FC Versailles 78 players
Stade Lavallois players
Ligue 2 players
Championnat National players
Championnat National 2 players
Championnat National 3 players
Association football defenders